Sybra unicoloripennis is a species of beetle in the family Cerambycidae. It was described by Breuning in 1950.

References

unicoloripennis
Beetles described in 1950